Hanna Lundberg (born 16 July 2002) is a Swedish orienteering competitor who represents the club OK Renen.

Career
In 2021 Lundberg won a gold medal in the middle distance at the Junior World Orienteering Championships in Turkey, as well as being part of the Swedish winning team in the relay, where she ran the last leg, and winning a silver medal in sprint, five seconds behind the winner.

In 2022 Lundberg won three gold medals. In the middle distance, in the relay, where she ran the third leg in the Swedish winning team, and in the long distance 

Competing at the 2021 European Orienteering Championships, she placed 8th in the sprint, and reached the semifinal in the knockout sprint.

In ski orienteering, Lundberg won three gold medals at the 2021 Junior World Ski Orienteering Championships, in sprint, long and middle distances, in addition to a silver medal in the relay.

References

2002 births
Living people
Swedish orienteers
Female orienteers
Foot orienteers
Ski-orienteers
21st-century Swedish women
Junior World Orienteering Championships medalists